The Queen City Hotel was constructed in 1871 by the Baltimore and Ohio Railroad (B&O) in Cumberland, Maryland to serve both as a train station and as a destination. Hosting 174 rooms, it also had such features as formal gardens with a fountain, a ballroom and 400-seat dining room. It was torn down in 1972 to make room for a new main United States Post Office and Distribution facility with a much smaller station for Amtrak service between the new Post Office and the railroad tracks.

History and design

The hotel was built only a year after the B&O completed its rail connection to Pittsburgh. This placed Cumberland at a major junction of the route northwest to Pittsburgh and the B&O main line west of the Ohio River. The building was designed by Thomas N. Heskett of the B&O Road Department in the Italianate style, and the construction cost was over $350,000. The hotel served as a summer resort, although the railroad did not actively promote it as a tourist destination. Located in a valley surrounded by mountains, it provided an escape from the summer heat.

The year the hotel was finished, the B&O expanded its resort business by constructing the Deer Park Hotel in Garrett County, Maryland. (The latter hotel closed in 1929 and was later destroyed by fire.)

The B&O completed construction of a new, expanded passenger station component in 1912. The station occupied three floors and included offices for the railroad company.

Decline and attempt at preservation
As with other railroads, passenger traffic on the B&O line declined in the mid-20th century. Interest in and occupancy of the hotel also declined. The hotel closed to the public in December 1964. Following a fire in 1969, the building was inspected by the city and declared to be a hazard. The B&O made plans to demolish the hotel, and supporters of historic preservation attempted court action to save the building. These efforts were unsuccessful and the B&O began demolition of the building in 1971.

The effort to preserve this ornate, Victorian-era structure was one of the classic preservation battles of the early 1970s. It was one of the last remaining railroad hotels in the U.S. The battle was lost when the building was demolished.

The hotel site is now occupied by the Cumberland Post Office.

Images

See also
Western Maryland Railway Station (Cumberland, Maryland) (extant)
Cumberland (Amtrak station)

References
Notes

Works cited

External links

Queen City Hotel National Register of Historic Places
Cumberland Amtrak Station

History of Cumberland, MD-WV MSA
Former Baltimore and Ohio Railroad stations
Historic American Engineering Record in Maryland
Hotels in Maryland
Buildings and structures in Cumberland, Maryland
Demolished hotels in the United States
Demolished railway stations in the United States
Railway hotels in the United States
Hotel buildings completed in 1871
Buildings and structures demolished in 1972
Italianate architecture in Maryland
1871 establishments in Maryland
1972 disestablishments in Maryland
Former railway stations in Maryland
Demolished buildings and structures in Maryland
Former National Register of Historic Places in Maryland